Ali Zand ( born May 25, 1999, June) is an Iranian karateka. was born in 1999 in Arak. Karate can be seen from the age of four under the supervision of his coach (Ghasem Shahrjerdi) and he is active in the Shitorio style. He has been in the national team camps since 2008, and together with his teammates won the first Iranian Men's Kata Team Adult Medal in the Karate World Championships  in Madrid in 2018.

Achievements

Early life 
Zand began karate at the age of four with Nosrat Karimi and continued the sport under Qasim Shahrjerdi.  He is currently an undergraduate biology student at Shahid Bahonar Cultural University of Isfahan  and has obtained his diploma in experimental science.

Sports career
He has been in the national team camps since 2008, and together with his teammates won the first Iranian Men's Kata Team Adult Medal in the Karate World Championships  in Madrid in 2018.

Honors

World Championship 

 2018  Bronze Kata Team Medal of the World Championships in Spain

Students of the world 

 2018  Japan Kata Team Bronze Medal Team of the Year 6 Japan

Asian 

 2017 Silver Team Kata Silver Team of the Year Kazakhstan 5
 2013 UAE Solo Kata Bronze Medal of the Year, UAE
 2019 Uzbekistan Team Kata Bronze Medal of the Year 6 Uzbekistan
 2021 Silver Team Kata, Almaty

World League 

 2013 Gold Kata Solo Gold medal in the World Championships in Turkey
 2018 Bronze Kate Medal of the French World League Team Championship of the Year
 2019 Bronze Kata Team of the Emirates World League Team Championship of the Year
 2019 Team Kata Bronze Medal of the World Championship Tournament of the Year 6 Turkey

World Cup 

 2016 Gold medal in the Kata Individual World Cup in Urmia
 2019 Gold Medal Kata Individual World Cup Tournament Urmia
 2016 Gold medal for Team Kata in Urmia World Cup
 2017 Gold medal for Team Kata in Urmia World Cup
 2018 Urmia World Cup Solo Kata Bronze Medal

References

External links
the instagram page of Ali Zand

People from Arak, Iran
Living people
1999 births
Place of birth missing (living people)
Iranian male karateka
20th-century Iranian people
21st-century Iranian people
Islamic Solidarity Games medalists in karate
Islamic Solidarity Games competitors for Iran